Avellino is a town and comune, capital of the province of Avellino in the Campania region of southern Italy.

Avellino may also refer to:

 Province of Avellino, a province in the Campania region of Italy
 Avellino (surname)
 Air Avellino, aka S.S. Felice Scandone, Italian basketball club
 Avellino eruption, eruption of Mount Vesuvius in the 2nd millennium BC
 U.S. Avellino 1912, Italian football club
 Roman Catholic Diocese of Avellino, Italian Catholic diocese in Naples